Romas Brandt Kukalis (also known simply as Romas; born in Toronto, Ontario) is a Canadian-American painter best known for his work as a cover artist for books of speculative fiction, including the Animorphs Chronicles. Kukalis also illustrated seven cards for the Magic: The Gathering collectible card game. Three were created under the name Romas Brandt Kukalis and five were created using only Romas for the Portal set.

Personal life
Kukalis was raised in Connecticut, and trained at Paier College of Art (from which he was graduated in 1978) in Hamden, Connecticut. He now lives in Keene, New Hampshire. He is married to Allison Barrows, a cartoonist, author, and advertising illustrator. They have a daughter and a son.

References

External links

20th-century American painters
20th-century Canadian painters
Canadian male painters
21st-century American painters
21st-century Canadian painters
American illustrators
American male painters
Artists from Connecticut
Artists from Toronto
Canadian emigrants to the United States
Canadian illustrators
Canadian speculative fiction artists
Fantasy artists
Game artists
Living people
People from Keene, New Hampshire
Science fiction artists
Year of birth missing (living people)
20th-century American male artists
20th-century Canadian male artists
21st-century Canadian male artists